Oklahoma Terror is a 1939 American Western film directed by Spencer Gordon Bennet.

Cast 
Addison Randall as Jack Ridgely
Al St. John as "Fuzzy" Glass
Virginia Carroll as Helen Martin
Don Rowan as Slade
Davison Clark as Cartwright
Glenn Strange as Ross Haddon
Tristram Coffin as Mason
Warren McCollum as Don Martin
Ralph Peters as Reb Nelson
Nolan Willis as Henchman Yucca Woodridge
Rusty as Rusty, Jack's Horse

External links 

1939 films
1939 Western (genre) films
1930s action films
1939 adventure films
American Western (genre) films
American adventure films
American black-and-white films
1930s English-language films
Monogram Pictures films
Films directed by Spencer Gordon Bennet
1930s American films